The 2007 World Junior Curling Championships were held from March 3 to 11 at Curl Mesabi in Eveleth, Minnesota.

Men

Teams

Round-robin standings
Final round-robin standings

Round-robin results

Draw 1
Saturday, March 3, 14:00

Draw 2
Sunday, March 4, 9:00

Draw 3
Sunday, March 4, 19:00

Draw 4
Monday, March 5, 14:00

Draw 5
Tuesday, March 6, 9:00

Draw 6
Tuesday, March 6, 18:00

Draw 7
Wednesday, March 7, 14:00

Draw 8
Thursday, March 8, 8:00

Draw 9
Thursday, March 8, 17:00

Tiebreaker
Friday, March 9, 14:00

Playoffs

Semifinals
Saturday, March 10, 14:00

Bronze-medal game
Sunday, March 11, 9:00

Gold-medal game
Sunday, March 11, 13:30

Women

Teams

Round-robin standings
Final round-robin standings

Round-robin results

Draw 1
Saturday, March 3, 8:30

Draw 2
Saturday, March 3, 19:00

Draw 3
Sunday, March 4, 14:00

Draw 4
Monday, March 5, 9:00

Draw 5
Monday, March 5, 19:00

Draw 6
Tuesday, March 6, 13:30

Draw 7
Wednesday, March 7, 9:00

Draw 8
Wednesday, March 7, 19:00

Draw 9
Thursday, March 8, 12:30

Tiebreakers
Thursday, March 8, 21:00

Friday, March 9, 9:00

Playoffs

Semifinals
Friday, March 9, 19:00

Bronze-medal game
Saturday, March 10, 18:00

Gold-medal game
Saturday, March 10, 19:00

External links

World Junior Curling Championships, 2007
World Junior Curling Championships
Curling in Minnesota
World Junior Curling Championships
Events in St. Louis County, Minnesota
International sports competitions hosted by the United States
International curling competitions hosted by the United States
World Junior Curling Championships
World Junior Curling Championships
Sports competitions in Minnesota